Hugo Ruiz Dominguez (born September 21, 1988) is a Mexican professional boxer. He is the former WBC Super bantamweight and WBA interim Bantamweight champion.

Professional career
In September 2010, Ruiz beat the veteran Jesús Vázquez to win the WBC Continental Americas super flyweight championship, the bout was held at the Arena Solidaridad, in Monterrey, Nuevo León, Mexico.

WBA bantamweight championship (interim)
On January 22, 2011, Ruiz won a technical ninth round decision over Nicaraguan Álvaro Pérez to capture the interim WBA bantamweight title. He would go to fight for the Regular title against Japanese boxer Kōki Kameda but would lose via split decision.

WBC super bantamweight title fight (interim)
In 2016, Ruiz beat fellow countryman Julio Ceja in a rematch to win the WBC Super bantamweight title. He would end up losing the title in his first defense against Japanese boxer Hozumi Hasegawa.

Ruiz vs. Guevara 
On, 19 January, 2019, Ruiz beat Alberto Guevara by unanimous decision in their 10 round contest The scorecards read 99-90, 100-89, 99-90 in favor of Ruiz.

Ruiz vs. Davis 
In his next bout, Ruiz faced WBA super featherweight champion Gervonta Davis. Ruiz was ranked as the #8 super feathwerweight in the world by the WBA. Davis cornered Ruiz from the opening bell, and was able to crack his guard towards the end of the round and drop him with a left hook. Ruiz made the count, but the referee decided to end the fight, awarding Davis with a first round knockout victory.

Professional boxing record

See also
List of Mexican boxing world champions
List of bantamweight boxing champions
List of super-bantamweight boxing champions

References

External links

Hugo Ruiz - Profile, News Archive & Current Rankings at Box.Live

1988 births
Living people
Sportspeople from Los Mochis
Boxers from Sinaloa
Mexican male boxers
Super-flyweight boxers
Bantamweight boxers
Super-bantamweight boxers
Featherweight boxers
Super-featherweight boxers
World bantamweight boxing champions
World super-bantamweight boxing champions
World Boxing Association champions
World Boxing Council champions